Susuz is a village in the Bucak District of Burdur Province in Turkey. Its population is 940 (2021).

References

Villages in Bucak District